

The Tahkenitch Landing Site (Smithsonian trinomial: 35DO130) is a prehistoric archeological site located in Oregon Dunes National Recreation Area near Gardiner, Oregon, United States. It also bears evidence of dramatic environmental changes including estuarine development, dune formation, and a transition from estuarine to lacustrine habitats. It was the first site on the Oregon coast to yield cultural remains older than about 3000 BP, and as such is one of the most significant sites on the Pacific coast of Oregon and North America.

The Tahkenitch Landing Site was listed on the National Register of Historic Places in 2003.

See also
National Register of Historic Places listings in Douglas County, Oregon

Notes

References

External links
, National Register of Historic Places cover documentation
Oregon Historic Sites Database entry

National Register of Historic Places in Douglas County, Oregon
Native American Archeological Sites of the Oregon Coast MPS